Odontorchilus is a small genus of South American birds in the family Troglodytidae. These small grey wrens are relatively long-tailed (giving them a superficially gnatcatcher-like appearance), and, uniquely in the family, they live in the canopy and subcanopy of humid forest, with one species associated with forest growing on the east Andean slope and the other with the Amazon rainforest.

Species
 Grey-mantled wren (Odontorchilus branickii)
 Tooth-billed wren (Odontorchilus cinereus)

References
 Schulenberg, T., D. Stotz, D. Lane, J. O' Neill, & T. Parker III. 2007. Birds of Peru. Christopher Helm. 

 
Troglodytidae
Taxa named by Charles Wallace Richmond
Taxonomy articles created by Polbot